Chirp is a Canadian animated children's television series created by J.J. Johnson. The series is based on the Canadian children's magazine Chirp. It was previewed on Kids' CBC on March 6, 2015, and premiered on April 20. A Spanish dubbed version start airing on V-me in the United States in 2019.

Premise
Chirp is about Chirp, Squawk, and Tweet, three birds who use their imaginations to go on adventures together.

Characters
 Chirp (voiced by Jacob Ewaniuk) is a male yellow bird who wears red boots.
 Squawk (voiced by Adrian David Lloyd) is a male blue bird.
 Tweet (voiced by Brianna D'Aguanno) is a female orange bird who has purple spots.
 Sparky (voiced by Elana Durtnall) is a dog who gives advice and explains what item Chirp, Squawk, and Tweet have.
 The Mail Squirrel is a flying squirrel that delivers packages to Chirp, Squawk, and Tweet, containing items to use on their adventures.
 The Vole Brothers are voles that use items to try and acquire apples in creative, and usually unsuccessful ways.

Episodes

Broadcast
Chirp premiered on March 6, 2015 on CBC, and September 14, 2015 on Tiny Pop, and on November 1 on JimJam, before being cancelled.
on September 25, 2017 through January 29, 2021, the series aired on Qubo Channel, before it closed operations, it is also airing on Nick Jr. in Canada. In 2019 through present a spanish dubbed version of the series chirp has been started to be aired on V-me at 10:30 in the morning after Rob the Robot in the United States.

References

External links

 on Kids' CBC

2010s Canadian animated television series
2010s preschool education television series
2015 Canadian television series debuts
2016 Canadian television series endings
Animated preschool education television series
Animated television series about birds
Animated television series about children
Canadian children's animated comedy television series
Canadian children's animated fantasy television series
Canadian flash animated television series
Canadian preschool education television series
CBC Television original programming
English-language television shows